Watershed is the debut solo album by Grant McLennan, founding member of The Go-Betweens released under the name G. W. McLennan. The album was recorded nine months after The Go-Betweens called it quits and was released in 1991.

The album featured contributions by singer-songwriters Paul Kelly and Dave Dobbyn, ex-Go-Between Amanda Brown (who was now half of Cleopatra Wong with Lindy Morrison) and Phil Kakulas of Blackeyed Susans. Despite this stellar line-up, the album received disappointing sales, reaching only No. 96 on the Australian album charts.

Singles from the album were "Haven't I Been A Fool" (Europe only), "When Word Gets Around" and "Easy Come Easy Go".

Track listing
All tracks written by Grant McLennan.

LP Side A:
 "When Word Gets Around" – 4:33
 "Haven't I Been a Fool" – 3:23
 "Haunted House" – 3:00
 "Stones for You" – 3:20
 "Easy Come Easy Go" – 4:00
 "Black Mule" – 4:45
LP Side B:
 "Putting the Wheels Back On" – 4:15
 "You Can't Have Everything" – 3:09
 "Sally's Revolution" – 3:57
 "Broadway Bride" – 3:42
 "Just Get That Straight" – 3:17
 "Dream About Tomorrow" – 5:57

Personnel
 Grant McLennan – guitars, vocals
 Paul Kelly
 Amanda Brown
 Dave Dobbyn – guitars, keyboards
 Huey Benjamin
 Ian Belton – bass
 James Cruickshank
 Kenny Davis Jnr
 "Diamond Jim" Elliott
 Phil Hall
 Phil Kakulas
 Francine McDougall
 Astrid Munday
 Sarah Peet
 Stephen Philip
 Kit Quarry
 Tim Rollinson – guitar
 Kathy Wemyss

Charts

References

1991 debut albums
Grant McLennan albums